The FC Basel 1916–17 season was their twenty-fourth season since the club's foundation on 15 November 1893. The club's chairman was Franz Rinderer. FC Basel played their home games in the Landhof in the district Wettstein in Kleinbasel.

Overview 
Peter Riesterer was team captain and as captain he led the trainings and was responsible for the line-ups. Basel played a total of 28 matches in the 1916–17 season. 12 of these were in the domestic league and 16 were friendly matches. Of these friendlies eight were won, three were drawn and five ended in a defeat. There were three home fixtures played in the Landhof and 13 away games. Over the Christmas, New Year period the team were taken to a training camp in Barcelona. On Christmas eve and on boxing day they played to friendlies against Barcelona. The first game ended in a defeat and the second was one. Two days later Basel played a friendly in same stadium, Camp de la Indústria, against La Chaux-de-Fonds and they were able to win this game too. On New Year's Eve and on New Year's Day Basel played two friendlies against local club Terrassa. Tarrassa were Serie B champions and played with five loaned first-class players. The first game was drawn and Basel won the second. Four of these friendly matches were played in the so called Basel championship against the two other local teams Old Boys and Nordstern Basel. Due to the early date of the new season, the three teams decided to play the return matches of the Championship all on one day as a tournament and played shortened games, two halves each with just 30 minutes. FC Basel won the Championship.

The domestic league, Swiss Serie A 1916–17, was divided into three regional groups, an east, a central and a west group. There were eight teams in the east and the west group, but only seven in the central group. Basel and the two other local teams were allocated to the Central group. The other teams playing in the Central group were FC Bern, Young Boys Bern, Biel-Bienne and Aarau. Basel played a good season, suffering only two defeats. Looking at things from the local point of view, Basel took three point from the two games against Old Boys and won both of their games against Nordstern Basel. Nordstern were in last position in the league table, but during the period of World War I there was not relegation/promotion between the Serie A and Serie B. Basel ended the season in second position with 15 points. In their 12 games Basel scored 31 goals and conceded 20. Karl Wüthrich was the team's best goal scorer, netting six times in 11 games. 

The Young Boys won the central group and continued to the finals. Here they played against La Chaux-de-Fonds and VFC Winterthur-Veltheim. Winterthur won both games in the finals and won the championship title.

Players 
Squad members

Results 

Legend

Friendly matches

Pre- and mid-season

Winter break to end of season

Serie A

Central group results

Central group league table

See also
 History of FC Basel
 List of FC Basel players
 List of FC Basel seasons

References

Sources 
 Rotblau: Jahrbuch Saison 2014/2015. Publisher: FC Basel Marketing AG. 
 Die ersten 125 Jahre. Publisher: Josef Zindel im Friedrich Reinhardt Verlag, Basel. 
 FCB team 1916–17 at fcb-archiv.ch
 Switzerland 1916-17 at RSSSF

External links
 FC Basel official site

FC Basel seasons
Basel